Babysitter is a 2022 Canadian comedy-drama film, directed by Monia Chokri. Adapted from a theatrical play by Catherine Léger, the film stars Patrick Hivon as Cédric, a man who loses his job and is forced to enter sensitivity training after he makes a sexist joke online that goes viral; meanwhile, his wife Nadine (Chokri) is struggling with post-partum depression following the birth of their child, and must hire a babysitter (Nadia Tereszkiewicz) to take care of the baby.

The cast also includes Steve Laplante, Ève Duranceau and Hubert Proulx.

The film was shot in Montreal, Quebec in 2020. It was submitted for consideration by the 2021 Cannes Film Festival, but was not selected.

The film premiered at the 2022 Sundance Film Festival, and was commercially released in April 2022.

Reception

Awards

References

External links
 
 Babysitter (version in French with English subtitles) at Library and Archives Canada

2022 films
2022 comedy-drama films
Canadian comedy-drama films
Films directed by Monia Chokri
French-language Canadian films
2020s Canadian films
2020s French-language films